Heinrich "Heinz" Körner (né Krczal; 2 July 1893 – 8 December 1961) was an Austrian football player and coach.

References

1893 births
1961 deaths
Association football forwards
Austrian footballers
Austrian expatriate footballers
Austria international footballers
SK Rapid Wien players
FK Austria Wien players
Stuttgarter Kickers players
Stuttgarter Kickers managers
Austrian football managers
Austrian expatriate football managers
Fortuna Düsseldorf managers
FC Basel managers
FC Bayern Munich managers
Expatriate footballers in Germany
Expatriate football managers in Germany
Austrian expatriate sportspeople in Germany
Expatriate football managers in Switzerland
Austrian expatriate sportspeople in Switzerland
Expatriate football managers in Luxembourg
Austrian expatriate sportspeople in Luxembourg
Place of birth missing
Footballers from Vienna